Including players from the Canberra Raiders that have represented while at the club and the years they  achieved their honours, if known.

International

Australia
    Mal Meninga (1986, 1988–94)
    Gary Belcher (1988–91)
    Sam Backo (1988)
    Peter Jackson (1988)
    Bradley Clyde (1989, 1991–94)
    Laurie Daley (1990–94, 1998–99)
    Glenn Lazarus (1990–91)
    Ricky Stuart (1990, 1994)
    Steve Walters (1991–94)
    Gary Coyne (1991)
    Brett Mullins (1994)
    David Furner (1994)
    Jason Croker (2000)
    Terry Campese (2008)
    Joel Monaghan (2008)
    David Shillington (2009–12)
    Tom Learoyd-Lahrs (2010)
    Josh Papalii (2013–19)
    Shannon Boyd (2016)
    Nick Cotric (2019)
    Jack Wighton (2019–22)

Australia (SL)
    Bradley Clyde (1997)
    Laurie Daley (1997)
    Brett Mullins (1997)
    David Furner (1997)
    Ken Nagas (1997)
    Luke Priddis (1997)

Great Britain
    John Bateman (2019)
    Josh Hodgson (2019)
    Elliott Whitehead (2019)

England
    Josh Hodgson (2015–18)
    Elliott Whitehead (2016–18, 2022)
    John Bateman (2018)

Fiji
    Noa Nadruku (1994–97)
    Tabua Cakacaka (2000)
    Mikaele Ravalawa (2017)
    Semi Valemei (2022)

New Zealand
    Brent Todd (1987, 1989–91)
    Sean Hoppe (1992–93)
    Quentin Pongia (1993, 1995–97)
    John Lomax  (1993–95)
    Ruben Wiki (1994-04)
    Lesley Vainikolo (1999-00)
    Bronson Harrison (2009–10)
    Joseph Tapine (2016-19, 2022)
    Jordan Rapana (2016–18, 2022)
    Charnze Nicoll-Klokstad (2019, 2022)
    Sebastian Kris (2022)

South Africa
    Sean Rutgerson (2000)

Papua New Guinea
    David Westley (1995–96)
    Bruce Mamando (1995)
    Neville Costigan (2008)
    Luke Page (2015)
    Kato Ottio (2016)
    Kurt Baptiste (2016)

Cook Island
    Sam Mataora (2013)
    Ezra Howe (2015)
    Jordan Rapana (2015)
    Makahesi Makatoa (2017)

Samoa
    Anthony Swann (2000)
    Alby Talipeau (2008)
    Anthony Milford (2013)
    Junior Paulo (2016)
    Joseph Leilua (2017)
    Josh Papalii (2017)

Tonga
    Una Taufa (1995)
    Greg Wolfgramm (2000)
    Brent Kite (2000)
    Sam Huihahau (2009)
    Bill Tupou (2014)
    Siliva Havili (2018–19)
    Ata Hingano (2018)

Turkey
    Aidan Sezer (2018)
    Emre Guler (2018)

Lebanon
  Reece Robinson (2014)
  Jamal Nchouk (2014)

Italy
  Paul Vaughan (2013)

Scotland
    Scott Logan (2008)

Ireland
    Brett White (2013)

Wales
    Justin Morgan (2000)

State Of Origin

New South Wales
    John Ferguson (1988–89)
    Bradley Clyde (1989–92, 1994)
    Laurie Daley (1989–94, 1996, 1998–99)
    Glenn Lazarus (1989–91)
    Ricky Stuart (1990–94)
    Jason Croker (1993, 1996, 2001)
    Brett Mullins (1994, 1996)
    Ken Nagas (1994)
    David Furner (1996, 1998–00)
    Ben Kennedy (1999)
    Ryan O'Hara (2004)
    Joel Monaghan (2008–10)
    Terry Campese (2009)
    Tom Learoyd-Lahrs (2009–10)
    Josh Dugan (2011)
    Blake Ferguson (2013)
 Nick Cotric (2019)
 Jack Wighton (2019–22)

New South Wales (SL)
    Bradley Clyde (1997)
    Laurie Daley (1997)
    Brett Mullins (1997)
    David Furner (1997)
    Ken Nagas (1997)
    Luke Priddis (1997)

Queensland
    Mal Meninga (1986, 1989–94)
    Gary Belcher (1986–90, 1993)
    Peter Jackson (1987–88)
    Sam Backo (1988)
    Gary Coyne (1989–92)
    Kevin Walters (1989)
    Steve Walters (1990–94, 1996)
    Clinton Schifcofske (2002, 2006)
    Adam Mogg (2006)
    Neville Costigan (2007)
    David Shillington (2009–13)
    Josh Papalii (2013–22)
    Dunamis Lui (2020)

All Stars Game

Indigenous All Stars
    Tom Learoyd-Lahrs (2010, 2011, 2012)
    Joel Thompson (2010, 2011, 2012, 2013)
    Travis Waddell (2010, 2011, 2012)
    Reece Robinson (2013)
    Blake Ferguson (2013)
    Jake Foster (2013)
    Jack Wighton (2013, 2015, 2016)
   Edrick Lee (2016)

NRL All Stars
    David Shillington (2010, 2013)
    Josh Dugan (2011, 2012)
    Jarrod Croker (2015)

City Vs Country Origin

NSW Country
    Ashley Gilbert (1988)
    Chris O'Sullivan (1988)
    Ivan Henjak (1989)
    Dean Lance (1990)
    Paul Martin (1991)
    Jason Croker (2001)
    Mark McLinden (2001)
    Simon Woolford (2002)
    Ryan O'Hara (2003–04)
    Phil Graham (2007)
    Joel Monaghan (2008–09)
    Todd Carney (2008)
    Terry Campese (2009)
    Alan Tongue (2009)
    Tom Learoyd-Lahrs (2010–12)
    Josh Dugan (2010–11)
    Joel Thompson (2011)
    Blake Ferguson (2012)
    Josh McCrone (2012–13)
    Jack Wighton (2013–16)
    Sam Williams (2013)
    Paul Vaughan (2014–16)
    Jarrod Croker (2015–16)
    Shannon Boyd (2016)

NSW City
    Bradley Clyde (1989)
    Glenn Lazarus (1989)
    Ricky Stuart (1990)
    Brad Drew (2004)
    Blake Austin (2015)
    Aiden Sezer (2016)

Other honours

Prime Minister's XIII
    Tom Learoyd-Lahrs (2005, 2009)
    Joel Monaghan (2007–09)
    David Shillington (2007, 2009, 2011, 2013)
    Terry Campese (2008, 2009)
    Alan Tongue (2008)
    Joe Picker (2008)
    Josh Dugan (2009)
    Blake Ferguson (2010, 2011)
    Josh Papalii (2013, 2014)
    Anthony Milford (2014)
    Jarrod Croker (2014)

Indigenous Dreamtime Team
    Justin Carney (2008)

New Zealand Māori
    Bronx Goodwin (2008)

Representative Captains

World Cup Captains
Australia
    Mal Meninga (1990–92)

Test Captains
Australia
    Mal Meninga (1990–94)
    Laurie Daley (1993, 1997 (SL), 1998)

Representative Coaching Staff

International
Australia
    Don Furner (Coach - 1986–87)
Tim Sheen's 20??

State Of Origin
New South Wales
    Tim Sheens (Coach - 1991)

Queensland
    Wayne Bennett (Coach - 1987)
    Neil Henry (Assistant Coach - 2007–08)

City Vs Country Origin
NSW City
    Tim Sheens (Coach - 1991)

Other honours
Indigenous Dreamtime Team
    Neil Henry (Coach - 2008)

References

Rugby league representative players lists
Canberra Raiders